Duke Tower is part of the Scotia Square complex in Downtown Halifax, Nova Scotia. It is used for office and commercial use and stands at 71 metres with 16 floors. It in part houses the offices of Emera as well as tenants such as the dentistry offices of Scotia Dental and a campus for the Canadian Language Learning Centre. The building is connected to the Downtown Halifax Link system and has a ground level entrance on Duke Street and an entrance in Scotia Square Mall.

See also 
 List of tallest buildings in Halifax, Nova Scotia

Other buildings in the Scotia Square Complex
Barrington Place
Barrington Tower
CIBC Building
Cogswell Tower

References

External links
Duke Tower at Emporis

Buildings and structures in Halifax, Nova Scotia
Brutalist architecture in Canada

Office buildings completed in 1970